Coxford may refer to the falling places in England:

Coxford, Cornwall, a hamlet in the parish of St Gennys, Cornwall
Coxford, Norfolk, village and civil parish in Norfolk
Coxford, Southampton, an electoral ward in Southampton
Coxford Priory, a ruined priory in Coxford, Norfolk

See also
Cox Ford Covered Bridge, in Turkey Run State Park, Indiana, U.S.